Ottomar Ladva (born 17 June 1997) is an Estonian chess player and grandmaster. He is a four-time Estonian Chess Champion (2013, 2015, 2016 and 2018).

Chess career
Ladva won the Estonian Junior Chess Championships (U18) in 2010, 2012, 2013 and 2014. Since 2006 he has participated in the European Junior Chess Championships and in European Union's Junior Chess Championships in different age groups.

In the Estonian Chess Championship, he has won four gold (2013, 2015, 2016, 2018) and one silver (2014) medals. He became the youngest Estonian champion at age 15, when he beat Lembit Oll's (1982) record.

In June 2015, he won a round-robin tournament in Riga finalised to get a Grandmaster norm.

Ladva represented Estonia in Chess Olympiads:
 In 2012, at reserve board in the 40th Chess Olympiad in Istanbul (+5, =1, -3)
 In 2014, at first board in the 41st Chess Olympiad in Tromsø (+5, =3, -3)
 In 2016, at second board in the 42nd Chess Olympiad in Baku (+4, =5, -2)

References

External links

1997 births
Living people
Estonian chess players
Chess grandmasters
Chess Olympiad competitors
Sportspeople from Haapsalu
21st-century Estonian people